Dinjerd (also Romanized as Dīnjerd; also known as Banī Gerd, Danījerd, Dīnehgerd, and Dīnerjed) is a village in Bazarjan Rural District, in the Central District of Tafresh County, Markazi Province, Iran. At the 2006 census, its population was 73, in 28 families.

References 

Populated places in Tafresh County